Division II or Division 2 may refer to:

Sports
 NCAA Division II, an intermediate-level division of the National Collegiate Athletic Association
 Division 2 (Swedish football)
 Division 2 (Swedish ice hockey), the fourth tier of ice hockey in Sweden
 Division 2 (Swedish women's football)
 Division II (US bandy), the second-highest league for bandy in the United States
 Division II (windsurf board), a class of windsurf board design
 FFHG Division 2, ice hockey, France
 Second Division, a list of divisions in various football leagues
 Division II (NCRHA), a division of the National Collegiate Roller Hockey Association

Other
 Division No. 2, Manitoba, a region of Manitoba, Canada
 Division No. 2, Saskatchewan, a census division within Saskatchewan, Canada
 Tom Clancy's The Division 2, a 2019 video game

See also
 2nd Division (disambiguation), a list of military units and formations
 B Division (disambiguation)
 Division 1 (disambiguation)